The 1963 Northwestern Wildcats team was an American football team that represented Northwestern University during the 1963 Big Ten Conference football season. In their eighth year under head coach Ara Parseghian, the Wildcats compiled a 5–4 record (3–4 against conference opponents) and finished in a tie for fifth place in the Big Ten Conference.

The team's offensive leaders were quarterback Tom Myers with 1,398 passing yards, Willie Stinson with 368 rushing yards, and Gary Crum with 417 receiving yards.

Schedule

References

Northwestern
Northwestern Wildcats football seasons
Northwestern Wildcats football